New South Wales Railways may refer to one of a number of government agencies that have been responsible for operating railway services in the Australian state of New South Wales:

New South Wales Government Railways from 1855 until 1932
Department of Railways New South Wales from 1932 until 1972
Public Transport Commission from 1972 until 1980
State Rail Authority from 1980 until 2003
RailCorp from 2003 until 2013
NSW TrainLink since 2013